Philippe Godeau is a French film producer, director and screenwriter. Godeau worked in distribution at the Gaumont Film Company before founding the production and distribution film company Pan-Européenne.

Godeau has produced many films including An Independent Life (1992), Bad Company (1999), Lightweight (2004), Les Sœurs fâchées (2004), Largo Winch (2008) and Romantics Anonymous (2010). He collaborated with Jaco Van Dormael in The Eighth Day (1996) and Mr. Nobody (2009). Godeau has worked with Maurice Pialat, Virginie Despentes, and Jean-Pierre Améris.

His directorial debut was the 2009 drama One for the Road, starring François Cluzet, Mélanie Thierry and Michel Vuillermoz. Based on reporter Herve Chabalier's autobiography about his battle with alcoholism, the story takes place in a French Alps retreat where Cluzet confronts his dangerous addiction. The film received five nominations at the César Awards 2010 with Mélanie Thierry winning Most Promising Actress. Godeau's next film, 11.6 (2013), is based on the real-life story of criminal Toni Musulin.

Filmography

References

External links

Living people
French film producers
French film directors
French male screenwriters
French screenwriters
Year of birth missing (living people)
Place of birth missing (living people)